"Dollar Bill" is a song by the American alternative rock group Screaming Trees. It is the second single released in support of their sixth album, Sweet Oblivion.

Formats and track listing 
UK 12" single (659179 6)
"Dollar Bill" (Van Conner, Mark Lanegan) – 4:33
"(There'll Be) Peace in the Valley (For Me)" (Thomas A. Dorsey) – 2:48
"Tomorrow's Dream" (Geezer Butler, Tony Iommi, Ozzy Osbourne, Bill Ward) – 4:14

UK 7" single (659179 7)
"Dollar Bill" (Van Conner, Mark Lanegan) – 4:33
"(There'll Be) Peace in the Valley (For Me)" (Thomas A. Dorsey) – 2:48

UK CD single (658918 2)
"Dollar Bill" (Van Conner, Mark Lanegan) – 4:35
"(There'll Be) Peace in the Valley (For Me)" (Thomas A. Dorsey) – 2:51
"Winter Song" (Mark Lanegan) – 3:52
"Tomorrow's Dream" (Geezer Butler, Tony Iommi, Ozzy Osbourne, Bill Ward) – 4:12

Charts

Personnel
Adapted from the Dollar Bill liner notes.

Screaming Trees
 Gary Lee Conner – guitar
 Van Conner – bass guitar
 Mark Lanegan – lead vocals
 Barrett Martin – drums

Production and additional personnel
 John Agnello – recording
 Don Fleming – production
 Andy Wallace – mixing
 Howie Weinberg – mastering

Release history

References

External links 
 

1992 songs
1992 singles
Screaming Trees songs
Song recordings produced by Don Fleming (musician)
Songs written by Van Conner
Songs written by Mark Lanegan
Epic Records singles